The Lake Rukwa tilapia (Oreochromis rukwaensis) is a species of cichlid endemic to the Lake Rukwa catchment in Tanzania. This species can reach a length of  SL. This species is important to local commercial fisheries.

References

Lake Rukwa tilapia
Fish of Lake Rukwa
Endemic freshwater fish of Tanzania
Taxa named by Franz Martin Hilgendorf
Taxa named by Paul Pappenheim
Lake Rukwa tilapia
Taxonomy articles created by Polbot